Ramsey Windmill is a grade II* listed post mill at Ramsey, Essex, England which has been restored.

History

Ramsey Windmill was originally built in Woodbridge, Suffolk. It was the north westerly one of four mills on the Mill Hills shown on the 1838 tithe map. The mill was moved to Ramsey in 1842 by Henry Collins, millwright of Woodbridge. The mill was working until the Second World War, and then left to deteriorate until 1974 when the owner, Mr Michael Organ, set about restoring the mill. Members of the Suffolk Mills Group assisted with work on Ramsey Windmill between 1974 and 1978.

Description

Ramsey Windmill is a post mill with a three-storey roundhouse. The mill was winded by a roof mounted fantail, similar to that seen at Icklesham today. It has four double Patent sails. There are two pairs of millstones in the breast and a third pair in the tail.

Trestle and roundhouse

The trestle is of oak. The mill was built with a roundhouse from the start. Having started life in Suffolk, and being moved by a Suffolk millwright, the normal practice from that county was followed, with the roundhouse having three storeys.

Body

The Crowntree is  square in section.

Sails and Windshaft

Ramsey Mill has a cast iron windshaft and four double Patent sails.

Machinery

The wooden Head Wheel is of clasp arm construction,  diameter, with 90 cogs of  pitch. It drives two pairs of overdrift French Burr millstones via a cast-iron Wallower and Spur Wheel. The cast-iron Tail Wheel is  diameter. It drives a single pair of underdrift  diameter millstones via an Upright Shaft and Spur wheel.

Fantail

Ramsey Windmill was winded by a six-bladed roof-mounted fantail, which blew off in 1939. The drive was down the back of the mill and thence to a ring set above the join of the quarterbars to the main post.

Millers

Robert Brooks 1842 - 1870
Robert Brooks Jr 1870 -
John Brooks 1887 -
L Lungley - 1937
R M Scott 1939
Lee Buchan 2013

References for above:-

External links

Windmill World webpage on Ramsey Windmill.

References

Post mills in the United Kingdom
Grinding mills in the United Kingdom
Windmills completed in 1842
Grade II* listed buildings in Essex
Windmills in Essex
Tendring
Grade II* listed windmills